Yuci District is a district in Jinzhong, Shanxi, China.

Administrative Divisions
Subdistricts:
Beiguan Subdistrict, Jinlun Subdistrict, Xinhua Subdistrict, Xinan Subdistrict, Luxi Subdistrict, Anning Subdistrict, Jingwei Subdistrict, Xinjian Subdistrict, Jinhua Subdistrict

Towns:
Wujinshan, Dongyang, Shitie, Changning, Beitian, Xiuwen

Townships:
Guojiabao Township, Zhangqing Township, Zhuangzi Township, Dongzhao Township

Climate

Universities
Yuci District is home to several new university campuses, as well as many others under construction, for major universities based in Shanxi, including Taiyuan University of Technology, Shanxi University of Traditional Medicine and Shanxi Medical University and Taiyuan Normal University. For this reason, Yuci is known in Shanxi as a university city.

Sister cities
 Quezon City, Philippines (since 2006)

References

External links
Official website of Yuci District Government

County-level divisions of Shanxi
Jinzhong